is a Japanese pop singer famous for her songs "Ryuusei" (part of the Naruto ending themes repertoire) and "Every Time". Her August 2005 single "Promise", is used as Yakitate!! Japan's second opening song. She released her first American debut song "I'm On My Way" in 2015.

Biography
TiA was born in Yokohama, Japan. Her father is Japanese and her mother is half German-American and half Japanese.

After sending her demo tapes to several companies, she signed a contract with Epic Records when she was just 16.

TiA debuted at the age of 16 and soon became famous for her song "Ryuusei" which starred as one of the "Naruto" ending themes. Her first album received a Gold Disc Award.

In 2004 she released her first music album, entitled Humming.

In 2014 she moved to New York City, where she currently resides. She has performed at the world-famous Apollo Theater, Carnegie Hall, SOB's, Cafe Wha?, Shrine, Silvana, Milk River, Prudential Center, Newark Symphony Hall, Juneteenth Festival 2016, and McDonald's GospelFest 2016.

She released her most recent single on iTunes in 2017.

Discography

Singles 
 Every Time, released on 2004-06-09
 Every Time
 Real Love
 Every Time (Instrumental)
 , released on 2004-08-04
 
 Missing You
  (Instrumental)
 , released on 2004-11-17
 
 
  (Instrumental)
  (Instrumental)
 Promise, released on 2005-08-03
 Promise
 
 Promise (Instrumental)
 , released on 2006-03-24
 
 
  (Instrumental)
 With you, released on 2009-01-21 (Digital single)
 With you

Albums 
 Humming, released on 2004-12-15
 Every Time
 
 Be Fulfilled
 
 Feel
 Missing You
 
 
 Blue
 Blanket
 
 Message, released on 2009-10-28
 Dare Yori Kimi Wo Suki De Iru Kara
 Closer
 Mannar Mode (feat. Ginmaru from Oota Cool)
 Aishiteru
 My Hero
 Future
 With You
 Home
 Kimi No Mikata
 Message ~Aitai~
 Sapphire ~Satoshi Homura Remix~
 Love Attendant, released on 2012-01-18
 恋するキモチ
 世界で一番キミが大好き。	
  100年に一度の愛しています。	
  Love Attendant～Taking off～	
  ブランニューデイ with TiA/K.J.		
  SEPTEMBER		
  サクラ涙	
 どうしてもキミじゃなきゃダメなの	
 さよなら大好きなキミへ	
 Forever Love
 Love Attendant～Thank you for...～

Mini-albums 
 Girl's Soul, released on 2008-06-11
 Diamond Road
 Sapphire
 Girl's Talk
 Want You
 Woman
 Always Yours
 Love Is Over

Awards 
 McDonald's GospelFest (1st Place in 2016) 1 of 20,000 participants
 Rip The Mic-1st Place 2016
 A Star is Born-1st Place 2016
 Big Poppa Rick Birthday Bash-1st Place 2016
 Apollo Amateur Night-Placed twice in 2015 & 2016

References

External links 
 TiA's Official Site (SONY)
 TiA's Official Site (HAMASOUL)
 TIA Fansite

21st-century Japanese singers
21st-century Japanese women singers
Pony Canyon artists
Sony Music Entertainment Japan artists
1966 births
Living people
People from Yokohama
Musicians from Kanagawa Prefecture